is a district located in Chiba Prefecture, Japan. As of January 2013, the district had a population of 49,488 and a population density of 369 persons per km2.

Towns and villages
Kujūkuri
Shibayama
Yokoshibahikari

Elevation of Ōamishirasato to city status
Ōamishirasato, formerly a town in Sanbu District, was elevated to city status on January 1, 2013, and is no longer part of Sanbu District.

History
The two districts were formally merged into the new Sanbu District on April 1, 1897.

Mergers
On March 27, 2006, the towns of Sanbu, Naruto, Hasunuma and Matsuo merged to form the new city of Sanmu.
On March 27, 2006, the town of Yokoshiba merged with Hikari from Sōsa District to form the new town of Yokoshibahikari in Sanbu District.

References

Districts in Chiba Prefecture